Intelsat VA F-13 or Intelsat 513, then named 'NSS-513', was a communications satellite operated by Intelsat and which was later sold to New Satellite Skies. Launched in 1988, it was the thirteenth of fifteen Intelsat V satellites to be launched. The Intelsat V series was constructed by Ford Aerospace, based on the Intelsat VA satellite bus. Intelsat VA F-13 was part of an advanced series of satellites designed to provide greater telecommunications capacity for Intelsat's global network.

Satellite 
The satellite was box-shaped, measuring 1.66 by 2.1 by 1.77 metres; solar arrays spanned 15.9 metres tip to tip. The arrays, supplemented by nickel-hydrogen batteries during eclipse, provided 1800 watts of power at mission onset, approximately 1280 watts at the end of its seven-year design life. The payload housed 26 C-band and 6 Ku-band transponders. It could accommodate 15,000 two-way voice circuits and two TV channels simultaneously. It also provided maritime communications for ships at sea.

Launch 
The satellite was successfully launched into space on 17 May 1988, at 23:58:00 UTC, by means of an Ariane 2 vehicle from the Centre Spatial Guyanais, Kourou, French Guiana. It had a launch mass of 1981 kg. The Intelsat VA F-13 was equipped with 6 Ku-band transponders more 26 C-band transponders for 15,000 audio circuits and two TV channels.

NSS-513 
Intelsat 513 was sold to New Satellite Skies on 30 November 1998, and renamed NSS-513. The satellite was deactivated in August 2003.

References 

Spacecraft launched in 1988
Intelsat satellites
SES satellites